District 10 of the Texas Senate is a senatorial district that currently serves a portion of Tarrant county in the U.S. state of Texas. The current Senator from District 10 is Democrat Beverly Powell.

Election history
Election history of District 10 from 1992.

Most recent election

2018

2014

2012

2008

Previous elections

2004

2002

2000

1996

1994

1992

District officeholders

References

10
Tarrant County, Texas